Diadasia bituberculata is a species of chimney bee in the family Apidae. It is found in Central America and North America.

References

Further reading

 
 
 

Apinae
Insects described in 1878